Hero is a 2002 wuxia film directed, co-written, and produced by Zhang Yimou, and starring Jet Li, Tony Leung Chiu-wai, Maggie Cheung, Zhang Ziyi, Donnie Yen and Chen Daoming. The historical background of the film refers to the Warring States Period in ancient China, when China was divided into 7 states. In 227-221 BC, the Qin state was about to unify the other six states, assassins from the six states were sent to assassinate the king of Qin. One of the most famous incidents was Jing Ke's attempted assassination of the King of Qin. The cinematography was by Christopher Doyle, and the musical score composed by Tan Dun.

Hero was first released in China on 24 October 2002. At that time, it was the most expensive project and one of the highest-grossing motion pictures in China. Miramax acquired American market distribution rights, but delayed the release of the film for nearly two years. Quentin Tarantino eventually convinced Miramax to open the film in American theaters on 27 August 2004.

The film received positive reviews from critics. It became the first Chinese-language movie to top the American box office, where it stayed for two consecutive weeks, and went on to earn $53.7 million in the United States and $177 million worldwide. It was nominated for an Academy Award for Best Foreign-Language Film, but lost to Nowhere in Africa.

Plot

In ancient China during the Warring States period, Nameless, a Qin prefect, arrives at the Qin capital city to meet the king of Qin, who has survived multiple attempts on his life by the assassins Long Sky, Flying Snow, and Broken Sword. As a result, the king has implemented extreme security measures: no visitors are allowed to approach the king within 100 paces. Nameless claims that he has slain the three assassins, and their weapons are displayed before the king, who allows the former to approach within ten paces and tell him his story.

Nameless recounts first killing Sky at a gaming house, before traveling to meet Flying Snow and Broken Sword, who have taken refuge at a calligraphy school in the Zhao state, in a city which was under siege by the Qin army. He tells Sword that he is there to commission a calligraphy scroll with the character for "Sword" (劍), secretly seeking to learn Sword's skill through his calligraphy. Nameless also learns that Snow and Sword, formerly lovers, have grown distant. Once the scroll is complete, Nameless reveals his identity and reveals that Snow and Sky had been together as lovers. Saying that Sky was certain Snow would avenge him, Nameless challenges Snow to a duel the next day. A heartbroken and angry Sword has sex with his pupil Moon. Snow kills Sword in revenge, and Moon as well when she attempts to seek vengeance. The next day, Nameless kills an emotionally unstable Snow before the Qin army, and claims her sword.

As the tale concludes, the king expresses disbelief and accuses Nameless of staging the duels with the assassins; he had, in the previous assassination attempt, perceived Sword as an honourable man who would not betray Snow in that manner. The king then suggests that what really happened was that the assassins volunteered their lives so that Nameless could gain the king's trust, which would allow Nameless to get close enough to the king to kill him.

In the king's hypothetical version of the story, Nameless seeks out Snow and Sword after staging the battle with Sky, telling them that he has perfected a technique that allows him to kill any target that is within ten paces. Nameless explains that he can use this to kill the king, but to get close enough he must present one of their weapons to the king; he further explains that he only needs to kill one of them in public in order to do this. Snow and Sword argue over who should be the one to die, resulting in a short fight in which Snow injures Sword. She meets Nameless before the Qin army; the recovering Sword watches helplessly as Snow is defeated. Moon later gives Nameless her master's sword, telling him that the swords of Snow and Sword should remain together in death as they had in life.

Nameless admits that he does indeed possess the special technique the king alluded to. However, he states that the King has underestimated Sword, and tells the true story. Nameless says that the special technique, while deadly, can also be used to deal a blow that misses all of the victim's vital organs while appearing fatal. He used this technique on Sky, and asked Snow and Sword to cooperate by faking a duel with him as well. Snow agrees to the plan, but Sword refuses. Snow angrily accuses Sword of ruining the opportunity they had three years ago, revealing that Sword had overpowered the king of Qin during their assault on his palace, but refused to kill him. She then attacks Sword, and manages to wound him with Nameless's help. The next day, Nameless "kills" Snow in front of the Qin army. Sword later explains to Nameless that he let the king live because he desired a unified, peaceful China, and that only the king of Qin could achieve that vision. He then sends Nameless off to the Qin capital, writing the words "Our Land" (天下) in the sand to persuade Nameless to reconsider the assassination.

The king, touched by the tale and Sword's understanding of his dream to unify China, ceases to fear Nameless. He tosses his own sword to Nameless and examines the scroll drawn by Sword. The king suddenly realizes it describes that an ideal warrior should, paradoxically, have no desire to kill. Understanding the wisdom of these words, Nameless abandons his mission and spares the king.

When Snow learns that Sword convinced Nameless to forgo the assassination, she furiously attacks Sword. Sword chooses not to defend himself so that Snow would understand his feelings for her, and Snow accidentally kills him as a result. Overwhelmed with sorrow, Snow commits suicide. At his court's urging, the king reluctantly orders Nameless to be executed for his assassination attempt, understanding that in order to unify the nation, he must enforce the law and use Nameless as an example. Nameless receives a hero's funeral. A closing text identifies the king as Qin Shi Huang, the first Emperor of China.

Cast
 Jet Li as Nameless  A Qin prefect of a small province, orphaned at an early age. Forged into a master swordsman over years of training, Nameless possesses the singular technique "Death at Ten Paces" (十步一殺 Shíbù yīshā) allowing him to strike precisely within that distance. He is the primary conspirator to assassinate the king, but ultimately decides that China's unification and peace are more important than vengeance. Hero also saw Jet Li's first appearance in a film produced by mainland China, after his debut in Shaolin Temple.
 Tony Leung as Broken Sword  Broken Sword and Flying Snow are the only assassins to ever infiltrate the king's palace, killing hundreds of his personal guard and very nearly the king himself before halting at the last moment. Of all the assassins, Broken Sword is the only one whom Nameless considers his equal in swordsmanship.
 Maggie Cheung as Flying Snow  A skilled assassin, Flying Snow is Broken Sword's lover and his equal as a swordsman (or close to). She vowed revenge upon the King for killing her father in battle. When Broken Sword convinces Nameless to abandon the assassination attempt on the king, Flying Snow kills him and later herself.
 Chen Daoming as the King of Qin  An ambitious leader who desires to become the first Emperor of China. Following an assassination attempt, he withdraws into his palace, which he empties of all but his most trusted advisors, and always wears his battle armor.
 Donnie Yen as Long Sky  An accomplished spearman, Sky is the first to be "defeated" by Nameless, who takes Sky's broken spear as proof of his defeat to the king.
 Zhang Ziyi as Moon  Broken Sword's loyal apprentice, skilled in using twin swords.

Production
Director Zhang Yimou collaborated with Australian cinematographer Christopher Doyle to help realize his plan to divide the film visually into five sections, each dominated by a particular color. Zhang had initially wanted to use different cinematographers and shooting styles, but that proved impractical.

Doyle compared their story to Rashomon, as it has an unreliable narrator and stories within stories. The film tells different version of the story of how an anonymous hero in ancient China overcomes three rivals. The stories are dominated by the colors red, blue, and white. Red represents desire, possessiveness and jealousy. Blue represents reason and friendship. White represents the balance of reason and desire, the ultimate truth. The overall framing story is darker with shades of black, and flashbacks are shown in vibrant greens. The colors were chosen for their aesthetic reasons, and not symbolic ones, and the colors orange and pink were not considered as options, and Doyle was dismissive of universal theories of color such as those put forward by Italian cinematographer Vittorio Storaro.

The lake sequences were filmed in the Jiuzhaigou national park in northern Sichuan, China. The desert sequences were shot near the border with Kazakhstan.

Music
The film was scored by Tan Dun, who also conducted the China Philharmonic Orchestra and Chorus for the recording. The composer Chen Yuanlin also collaborated in the project. Itzhak Perlman performs most of the violin solos, with additional solos by Tan Dun himself. The theme song, Hero (英雄), composed by Zhang Yadong and Lin Xi, was sung by Faye Wong. It is unavailable in the American versions of the film DVD and soundtrack album. Wind & Sand (風沙) is a song inspired by the film and was sung by Tony Leung. The musical instrument seen and played during the fight in the weiqi courtyard scene is a guqin. The guqin music for that scene was performed by Liu Li.

Release
Hero was first released in China on 24 October 2002. Miramax owned the American-market distribution rights, but delayed the release of the film a total of six times. Import DVDs of the film were sold online and Miramax demanded that the sites cease selling the DVD.

The movie was finally released in American theaters on 27 August 2004 after intervention by Disney executives, Government of China and Quentin Tarantino, who helped secure an English-subtitled release. Tarantino also offered to lend his name to promotional material for the film in order to attract box office attention to it; his name was attached to the credits as "Quentin Tarantino Presents". In addition, a sword held by Jet Li's character in the original promotional poster was replaced by weapon resembling a katana, a Japanese weapon, in the North American promotional poster, which was both anachronistic and culturally misplaced. The United States version of the DVD, with Mandarin, English, and French soundtracks, was released on 30 November 2004.

In the United Kingdom, it was 2013's sixth most-watched foreign-language film on television, with 150,100 viewers on Channel 4.

Translation of "Tianxia"
There has been some criticism of the film for its American-release translation of one of the central ideas in the film: Tiānxià which literally means "Under heaven", and is a phrase to mean "the World". For its release in Belgium, two years before the U.S. release, the subtitled translation was "all under heaven". The version shown in American cinemas was localized as the two-word phrase "our land" instead, which seems to denote just the nation of China rather than the whole world. Whether Zhang Yimou intended the film to also have meaning with regard to the world and world unity was at that time difficult to say. Zhang Yimou was asked about the change at a screening in Massachusetts and said it was a problem of translation: "If you ask me if 'Our land' is a good translation, I can't tell you. All translations are handicapped. Every word has different meanings in different cultures." In Cause: The Birth of Hero—a documentary on the making of Hero—Zhang mentions that he hopes the film will have some contemporary relevance, and that, in the aftermath of the September 11 attacks the themes of universal brotherhood and "peace under heaven" may indeed be interpreted more globally, and taken to refer to peace in "the world." The phrase was later changed in television-release versions of the film.

Reception

Box office
The film opened in China in October 2002. It topped the 2002 annual Chinese box office and set the record for the domestic highest-grossing film in China, earning .

On 27 August 2004, after a long delay, Hero opened in 2,175 North American screens uncut and subtitled. It debuted at #1, grossing  in its opening weekend. Hero grossed  in the United States and Canada. It is the fourth highest grossing non-English film in North America, behind Life is Beautiful, Crouching Tiger Hidden Dragon, and The Passion of the Christ.

Critical response
On Rotten Tomatoes, the film has an approval rating of 94% based on 211 reviews, with an average rating of 8.20/10. The website's critics consensus reads, "With death-defying action sequences and epic historic sweep, Hero offers everything a martial arts fan could ask for." On Metacritic, the film has a weighted average score of 85 out of 100 based on 42 critics, indicating "universal acclaim". Audiences surveyed by CinemaScore gave the film a grade "A−" on scale of A to F.

Roger Ebert called it "beautiful and beguiling, a martial arts extravaganza defining the styles and lives of its fighters within Chinese tradition." He said the film "demonstrates how the martial arts genre transcends action and violence and moves into poetry, ballet and philosophy." Richard Corliss of Time described the film as being like "Rashomon with a Mandarin accent" and compared the film to House of Flying Daggers but said "Hero is the masterpiece", adding that "it employs unparalleled visual splendor to show why men must make war to secure the peace and how warriors may find their true destiny as lovers." Michael Wilmington of the Chicago Tribune called it "swooningly beautiful, furious and thrilling" and "an action movie for the ages." Charles Taylor of Salon.com took an especially positive stance, deeming it "one of the most ravishing spectacles the movies have given us". Manohla Dargis of The New York Times wrote: "Filled with meticulous set pieces, including a showdown between Snow and Moon set among swirls of golden-yellow leaves, Hero is easy on the eyes, but it's too segmented to gather much momentum and too art-directed to convey much urgency." Dargis was impressed by the beauty of the actors and their compelling performances, "whose passions erupt as fiercely as any of the film's fights though often to more devastating effect." She concludes: "less than the sum of its attractive parts, it's nonetheless generally pleasurable." Derek Elley of Variety called it "A dazzlingly lensed, highly stylized meditation on heroism."
Nevertheless, there were several film critics who felt the film had advocated autocracy and reacted with discomfort. J. Hoberman of The Village Voice deemed it to have a "cartoon ideology" and justification for ruthless leadership comparable to Triumph of the Will. Stephen Hunter of The Washington Post wrote an otherwise positive review but concluded: "The movie, spectacular as it is, in the end confronts what must be called the tyrant's creed, and declares itself in agreement with the tyrant."

The film also has been interpreted as a nuanced investigation into the relationship between culture on one hand, and political or military power on the other. In this approach, the film comments not only on China and its position in the world, but also on the ongoing erasures of languages and cultures under globalization.

Zhang Yimou himself maintained that he had absolutely no political points to make.

Accolades
In 2014, Time Out polled several film critics, directors, actors and stunt actors to list their top action films. Hero was listed at 77th place on this list.

See also
 House of Flying Daggers 
 Jet Li filmography
 List of martial arts films

References

External links

 
 
 Hero at LoveHKFilm.com

2002 films
2002 martial arts films
Miramax films
Chinese action adventure films
Chinese epic films
Chinese martial arts films
Cultural depictions of Qin Shi Huang
Fiction with unreliable narrators
Films directed by Zhang Yimou
Films scored by Tan Dun
Films set in the 3rd century BC
Films set in the Warring States period
2000s Mandarin-language films
Wuxia films
Hong Kong action adventure films
Hong Kong epic films
Hong Kong martial arts films
Hong Kong historical drama films
Hong Kong historical action films
Chinese historical action films
Chinese historical drama films
2000s Hong Kong films